is the name of a former province of Japan in the area that is today the southern part of Fukuoka Prefecture on Kyūshū. Chikugo was bordered by Hizen, Chikuzen, Bungo, and Higo Provinces.

History
The ancient capital of the province was located near the modern city of Kurume, Fukuoka.

During the Edo period, the province was divided into two fiefs: the Tachibana clan held the southern fief at Yanagawa, and the Arima clan held the northern fief at Kurume. 

During the Meiji era, the provinces of Japan were converted into prefectures.  Maps of Japan and Chikugo Province were reformed in the 1870s.

Timeline
 1359 (Enbun 4): Battle of Chikugo River (Chikugogawa), Ashikaga gain a military victory.
 1361 (Enbun 6) : Imperial forces led by Kikuchi Takemitsu capture Dazaifu.

Shrines and temples

Kōra taisha was the chief Shinto shrine (ichinomiya) of Chikugo.

Historical districts
 Fukuoka Prefecture
 Ikuha District (生葉郡) – merged with Takeno District to become Ukiha District (浮羽郡) on February 26, 1896
 Kamitsuma District (上妻郡) – merged with Shimotsuma District to become Yame District (八女郡) on February 26, 1896
 Mihara District (御原郡) – merged with former Mii (御井郡) and Yamamoto Districts to become a new and expanded Mii District (三井郡) on February 26, 1896
 Mii District (pre-1896) (御井郡) – absorbed Mihara and Yamamoto Districts to become a new and expanded Mii District (三井郡) on February 26, 1896
 Miike District (三池郡) – dissolved
 Mizuma District (三潴郡)
 Shimotsuma District (下妻郡) – merged with Kamitsuma District to become Yame District on February 26, 1896
 Takeno District (竹野郡) – merged with Ikuha District to become Ukiha District on February 26, 1896
 Yamamoto District (山本郡) – merged with former Mii (御井郡) and Mihara Districts to become a new and expanded Mii District (三井郡) on February 26, 1896
 Yamato District (山門郡) – dissolved

See also
 Kurume Domain
 Yanagawa Domain
 Miike Domain

Notes

References
 Nussbaum, Louis-Frédéric and Käthe Roth. (2005).  Japan encyclopedia. Cambridge: Harvard University Press. ;  OCLC 58053128

External links 

  Murdoch's map of provinces, 1903

Former provinces of Japan